Ceremonial Oath is a Swedish death metal band who formed in 1989 under the name "Desecrator", changed their name to Ceremonial Oath in 1991 and disbanded in 1996. During their short career they released three demos, one EP and two albums. Their influence is greater than their short lifespan suggests: several of the band members would later create or join metal bands that would gain fame and fortune on the future metal scene, such as In Flames, an influential band to the melodic death metal genre; and HammerFall, a band who would greatly influence the awakened interest in power metal and traditional heavy metal.

Ceremonial Oath reunited for an appearance at the inaugural edition of The Gothenburg Sound festival on January 5–6, 2013 at Trädgår'n in Gothenburg, Sweden, and also made appearances on a few other festivals later the same year. In addition to that, a remixed and remastered version of the 1993 album The Book of Truth was re-released in the beginning of 2013. Other than reuniting for a string of shows, Ceremonial Oath has no plans to record a new album.

Members
Current members
Oscar Dronjak – vocals, guitar (1989–1993, 2012–present)
Anders Iwers – guitar (1989–1996, 2012–present)
Markus Nordberg – drums (1991–1996, 2012–present)
Jesper Strömblad – bass (1991–1993, 2012–present)

Former members
Ulf Assarsson – drums (1989–1991)
Marcus Fredriksson – bass, vocals (1989–1990)
Thomas Johansson – bass (1993–1996)
Mikael Andersson – guitar (1993–1996)
Anders Fridén – vocals (1993–1996)

Session musicians
Tomas Lindberg – vocals (1993–1995)
Peter Ekberg – bass (1990–1991)
Fredrik Nordström – keyboards (1992–1993)

Timeline

Discography
as Desecrator 
 Wake the Dead (Demo, 1990)
 Black Sermons (Demo, 1990)

as Ceremonial Oath
 Promo 1991 (Demo, 1991)
 Lost Name of God (EP, Corpse Grinder Records, 1992)
 The Book of Truth (CD, Modern Primitive Records, 1993)
 Carpet (CD, Black Sun Records, 1995)

References

Swedish melodic death metal musical groups
Musical groups disestablished in 1996
Musical groups established in 1989
Musical quintets